Alosa kessleri, also referred to as the Caspian anadromous shad, the blackback, or the black-spined herring, is a species of clupeid fish. It is one of the several species of shad endemic to the Caspian Sea basin.

This is an anadromous species which ascends from the Caspian to the Volga river up to the Volgograd to spawn. Before the construction of the Volgograd dam it migrated up to the Kama and Oka tributaries. Few fish enter the Terek and Ural Rivers.

While the migration upstream is broken, it seems the fish have found new breeding grounds south of the dam, and the population is now abundant. The species may be threatened by commercial and illegal fishing in the Caspian Sea and at the mouth of the Volga during the migration, though.

See also 
 Alosa volgensis

References 

kessleri
Fish of the Caspian Sea
Freshwater fish of Asia
Freshwater fish of Europe
Volga basin
Least concern biota of Asia
Least concern biota of Europe
Fish described in 1887